Marley Lynn Shriver (February 13, 1937 – February 13, 2016) is an American former competition swimmer who represented the United States at the 1956 Summer Olympics in Melbourne, Australia.  She swam for the second-place U.S. team in the qualifying heats of the women's 4×100-meter freestyle relay.  Shriver was not eligible to receive a silver medal under the 1956 Olympic swimming rules, however, because she did not swim in the relay final.

Marley died on her 79th birthday at her home in New Castle, Colorado.

References

1937 births
American female freestyle swimmers
Olympic swimmers of the United States
Sportspeople from Muskegon, Michigan
Swimmers at the 1956 Summer Olympics
2016 deaths
21st-century American women